Harry Kraf (January 1, 1907 – December 22, 1989) was an American lawyer and politician from New York.

Life
He was born on January 1, 1907, in New York City. He attended Public School No. 3 and Morris High School, both in the Bronx. He graduated LL.B. from Fordham Law School, and was admitted to the bar in 1929. He practiced law in New York City, and entered politics as a Democrat. He married Lena Ruth Rosenfeld on June 10, 1931, in New York City. They had one daughter, the novelist Elaine Kraf and one granddaughter, Milena Altman Kraf.

Kraf was elected in November 1955 to the New York State Senate, to fill the vacancy caused by the death of John J. Donovan, Jr., and took his seat in the 170th New York State Legislature at the beginning of the session of 1956. He was re-elected several times and remained in the Senate until 1965, sitting in the 171st, 172nd, 173rd, 174th and 175th New York State Legislatures. In September 1965, after re-apportionment, Kraf ran for re-nomination in the 37th District, but was defeated in the Democratic primary by Archie A. Gorfinkel. In January 1966, Kraf was appointed as counsel to a legislative committee.

He was a member of the New York State Assembly (75th D.) from 1967 to 1972, sitting in the 177th, 178th and 179th New York State Legislatures. In the Assembly, Kraf was known for working on traffic and air pollution problems. He also joined with his Bronx legislative colleagues in 1967 in an attempt to save St. Francis Hospital. In November 1972, he was elected to the New York City Civil Court.

He died on December 22, 1989, in Montefiore Medical Center in the Bronx.

Sources

1907 births
1989 deaths
Democratic Party New York (state) state senators
Democratic Party members of the New York State Assembly
Fordham University School of Law alumni
New York (state) state court judges
20th-century American lawyers
20th-century American judges
Politicians from the Bronx
20th-century American politicians